The following is a list of the television networks and announcers who have broadcast college football's Redbox Bowl throughout the years.

Television

Radio

References

Redbox Bowl
Broadcasters
Redbox Bowl
Redbox Bowl
Redbox Bowl
Fox Sports announcers